Paradictyna rufoflava is a spider of the genus Paradictyna endemic to New Zealand. It is a cribellate (hackled band-producing) spider of the family Dictynidae. According to Spiders of New Zealand and Their Worldwide Kin, P. rufoflava is a hunting spider of variable coloring found in forests.

References
  (1946): Revision of the Araneae of New Zealand. Part II. Rec. Auckland Inst. Mus. 3: 85-97.
 List of invertebrates on Mokoia Island, Lake Rotorua, Ecological Research Associates of New Zealand Inc.
 Forster, Raymond Robert and Lyndsay McLaren Forster, (2005-09-23) Spiders of New Zealand and Their Worldwide Kin. Otago University Press. 
  (2009): The world spider catalog, version 9.5. American Museum of Natural History.

Dictynidae
Spiders of New Zealand
Spiders described in 1946